Paul-Louis Rougnon (24 August 1846 – 11 December 1934) was a French composer, pianist and music educator.

Biography 
Paul Rougnon was born in Poitiers the son of Louis Rougnon and Claire Clotilde Robin. A student at the Lycée Bonaparte (now the Lycée Condorcet), he entered the Conservatoire de Paris in 1861 as an auditor, then a full-time student in 1862. He studied piano, music theory and composition with such masters as Édouard Batiste, François Bazin, Ambroise Thomas, Antoine François Marmontel and César Franck. He received degrees in music theory in 1865, harmony in 1868 and counterpoint in 1870.

In 1873, at age 27, Rougnon became a professor at the Conservatoire, then under the directorship of Ambroise Thomas. He taught music theory, counterpoint and fugue until his retirement in 1921. His students include Alfred Cortot, Yves Nat, Fernand Oubradous, Noël Gallon, and Henri Mulet. In addition to teaching, he was an administrator for the choral societies Orphéon and Sociétés musicales mutuelles. He composed choral works especially for these ensembles.  After the turn of the century, he began to work with various magazines including Piano-Soleil, Le Monde Musical, Le Ménestrel, Le Monde Orphéonique and L'Harmonie.

As a prolific composer and writer, he composed more than 300 musical works in addition to literary and pedagogical volumes.  He composed hundreds of piano pieces, two operas, some chamber music, and also vocal and choral works.  In 1896, under the tenure of Théodore Dubois, the Conservatoire began the practice of charging composers to write contest pieces. Rougnon began composing works for this purpose, particularly for piano, viola, flute, and trumpet. His treatises on music theory and piano pedagogy are still in use today.

Rougnon received a gold medal for his collective works of music education at the 1900 Exposition Universelle in Paris.  In 1911, he was made a Chevalier of the Légion d'honneur.

Rougnon married Marie-Louise de Beurmann in 1887 and had five children. He died on 11 December 1934 at his home in Saint-Germain-en-Laye.

Selected works

Compositions 
This is a list of compositions sorted by genre, opus number, date of composition (or publication), and title.

Literary works 
 Devoirs élémentaires de musique théorique et pratique en deux livres (Éditions Gallet)
 Dictées harmoniques à 2 parties (Heugel and Cie., 1914)
 Dictionnaire général de l'art musical (Éditions Delagrave, 1935)
 Dictionnaire musical des locutions étrangères (italiennes, allemandes, etc.) (c.1880, Éditions Delagrave, 1918, 1935)
 La Musique et son histoire (Librairie Garnier Frères, 1920)
 Le Mouvement et les nuances d'expression dans la musique (P. Dupont, 1893)
 Le Rythme et la mesure: Traité complet théorique, analytique & practique (Éditions Enoch et Cie.)
 Manuel de transposition musicale: étude de toutes les clés; appliquée aux instruments de musique et principalment au piano, à l'orgue, à la harpe (Heugel, 1912)
 Origines de la notation musicale moderne: Étude historique (1925)
 Petit dictionnaire de musique: termes musicaux usuels (Heugel, 1922)
 Petit dictionnaire liturgique de musique religieuse: théorique, pratique, historique (P. Lethielleux, 1921)
 Petite biographie des grands compositeurs (in 3 volumes) 1. École française 2. École italienne 3. École allemande (Éditions Margueritat, 1924)
 Souvenirs de 60 années de vie musicale et de 50 années de professorat au Conservatoire de Paris (Éditions Margueritat, 1925)

Pedagogical publications
 Cours de chant choral (Andrieu et Cie., 1924)
 Cours de piano élémentaire et progressif formant un cours complet de mécanisme (E. Gallet, 1899; Éditions M. Combre)
 Grandes études journalières de solfège à changement de clef (Éditions du Ménestrel, 1907)
 Mon piano: Hygiène du piano, Petit dictionnaire explicatif et historique des éléments constitutifs du piano (Éditions Fischbacher, 1921)
 Principes de la musique. Étude développée (Édition Delagrave, 1936)
 Solfège élémentaire: théorique, analytique et pratique à la portée des jeunes élèves (Éditions Combre)
 Solfège en 16 volumes (Éditions Combre)
 Traité pratique de prosodie dans la composition musicale et la déclamation lyrique (Éditions Enoch et Cie.)
 Traité pratique d'harmonie (Éditions Gallet)

References

External links
 
 Paul Rougnon: Biography, photographs, works, etc. 

1846 births
1934 deaths
People from Poitiers
French classical composers
French male classical composers
Composers for piano
French opera composers
Male opera composers
Academic staff of the Conservatoire de Paris
Conservatoire de Paris alumni
Chevaliers of the Légion d'honneur